Oluwatomisin (Tomi) Akintunde Adeloye (born 17 February 1996) is an English professional footballer who plays as a forward for Swindon Town.

Career

Early career
Adeloye began his career at Charlton Athletic where he enjoyed great success through the youth ranks, he went on to attract interest from Nigeria at youth level. He was then invited to train with Nigeria at U16 level.  After departing Charlton Athletic, he moved to the youth team of both Millwall whilst he completed his scholarship.  Soon after, he signed his first professional contract with premier league outfit Stoke City scoring five goals for the U18s side before the close of the 2013–14 campaign. The majority of his moves since were all in the English Fifth tier where he got first-team experience with over 80 appearances to his name in the National League for Dagenham & Redbridge, Ebbsfleet United and his most recent side Barnet.

Tomi had a brief spell with East Kilbride in December 2020, scoring a brace as a second-half substitute on his debut in a 9–0 win over Edinburgh University, but made just one further appearance before the Lowland League was suspended and he played out the season with National League side Barnet, scoring three goals in 17 appearances.

Ayr United
After turning down a two-year deal at Barnet Adeloye moved back to Scotland on 1 July 2021 joining Ayr United on an initial one-year deal. Adeloye would become Ayr's top scorer that season with 14 goals in 38 appearances and would leave the club at the end of the season as a fan favourite.

Swindon Town
On 15 July 2022, Adeloye signed for Swindon Town on a two-year deal and made his debut in the 3–0 loss at Harrogate Town. Adeloye scored his first goal for Swindon as a substitute in a 2-1 defeat at Newport County.

Style of play
Upon joining Ayr United Adeloye was described by manager David Hopkin as “Something different to what we already have. He has real pace and power and leads the line really well”.

Career statistics

References 

1998 births
Living people
English footballers
National League (English football) players
Scottish Professional Football League players
Chelmsford City F.C. players
Dover Athletic F.C. players
Leatherhead F.C. players
Welling United F.C. players
F.C. United of Manchester players
Hartlepool United F.C. players
Dagenham & Redbridge F.C. players
Ebbsfleet United F.C. players
East Kilbride F.C. players
Barnet F.C. players
Ayr United F.C. players
Swindon Town F.C. players
Black British sportsmen